Richard Bromfield, Ph.D., is a psychologist on the faculty of Harvard Medical School who specializes in the therapy and upbringing of children and adolescents. His writings for the popular press have been widely praised for their relevance and accessibility.

Books 

 Playing for Real: The World of a Child Therapist (Dutton, 1992) re-issued Basil Books 2007.
 Doing Child and Adolescent Psychotherapy: The Ways and Whys (Jason Aronson, 1999)
 Handle with Care: Understanding Children and Teachers: a Field Guide for Parents and Educators (Teachers College Press, 2001)
 How to Turn Boys Into Men Without a Man Around the House: A Single Mother's Guide, with Cheryl Erwin (Prima Pub., 2002)
 Living with the Boogeyman: Helping Your Child Cope with Fear, Terrorism, and Living in a World of Uncertainty (Prima Pub., 2002)
 Teens in Therapy: Making it Their Own (W.W. Norton, 2005), W W Norton page
 Doing Child and Adolescent Psychotherapy: Adapting Psychodynamic Treatment to Contemporary Practice (Wiley-Interscience, 2007)
 How to Unspoil Your Child Fast (Basil Books, 2007) (9780979788512)

References 

Living people
21st-century American psychologists
Year of birth missing (living people)